Kenneth Paul Johnson (born 1953) is a retired public library director from southern Virginia, and a writer on modern Western esotericism as well as North Carolina history.

Books
Report of Proceedings: Secret Doctrine Centenary (Theosophical University Press, 1989) includes a presentation by Johnson, "The Chaldean Book of Numbers".
In Search of the Masters (self-published, 1990) 
The Masters Revealed (SUNY Press, 1994)
Initiates of Theosophical Masters (SUNY Press, 1995) 
Edgar Cayce in Context (SUNY Press, 1998).
The Inner West (Tarcher/Penguin, 2004) 
Dictionary of Modern American Philosophers (Thoemmes, 2005) 
Dictionary of Virginia Biography, Vol. 3 (Library of Virginia, 2006) 
Pell Mellers: Race and Memory in a Carolina Pocosin (Backintyme, 2008, 2013) 
Carolina Genesis: Beyond the Color Line  (Backintyme, 2010)

Articles

References

External links
 Typhon Press catalog

Esotericism
Living people
Theosophy
21st-century American historians
21st-century American male writers
1953 births
American male non-fiction writers
Helena Blavatsky biographers